Claus Adolf Moser, Baron Moser,  (24 November 1922 – 4 September 2015) was a British statistician who made major contributions in both academia and the Civil Service. He prided himself rather on being a non-mathematical statistician, and said that the thing that frightened him most in his life was when Maurice Kendall asked him to teach a course on analysis of variance at the LSE.

Life
Claus Adolf Moser was born in Berlin in 1922. His father was Dr Ernst (Ernest) Moser (1885–1957), owner of the private bank Ernst Moser & Co. in Berlin (est. 1902, liquidated in 1938). His mother was Lotte (née Goldberg, 1897–1976), a talented amateur musician. In 1936 he moved to England with his parents and his brother Heinz Peter August. He went to Frensham Heights School and the London School of Economics (LSE). Despite being Jewish, in 1940, he was interned as an enemy alien in Huyton Camp.

After four months, he was released and served in the Royal Air Force, 1943–1946. He then returned to LSE as Assistant Lecturer, then Lecturer, in Statistics, 1946–1955; Reader in Social Statistics, 1955–1961; Professor of Social Statistics, 1961–1970; Visiting Professor of Social Statistics, 1970–1975.

In 1965 he was elected a Fellow of the American Statistical Association.
He was appointed a Commander of the Order of the British Empire (CBE) in the 1965 New Year Honours, and in 1965, he applied for a job at the Central Statistical Office but was rejected, as a former enemy alien. However, this did not seem to be a problem when in 1967 Harold Wilson appointed him Director of the Central Statistical Office. He was made a Knight Commander of the Bath (KCB) in the 1973 New Year Honours. He resigned as Director of the Central Statistical Office in 1978.

He held a very wide variety of posts. These included:

 Member, Governing Body, Royal Academy of Music, 1967–1979 
 Director, Central Statistical Office, 1968–1978 
 BBC Music Advisory Committee, 1971–1983
 Visiting Fellow, Nuffield College, Oxford, 1972–1980 
 Chairman, Royal Opera House, Covent Garden, 1974–1987
 Director, N M Rothschild & Sons, 1978–1990 (Vice-chairman, 1978–1984)
 President, Royal Statistical Society, 1978–1980
 Chairman, Economist Intelligence Unit, 1979–1983
 Warden of Wadham College, Oxford, 1984–1993
 Chancellor, Keele University, 1986–2002
 Trustee, London Philharmonic Orchestra, 1988–2000
 President, British Association for the Advancement of Science, 1989–1990
 Pro-Vice-Chancellor, University of Oxford, 1991–1993
 Chairman, British Museum Development Trust, 1993–2003, later Chairman Emeritus
 Chancellor, Open University of Israel, 1994–2004

He was made a life peer with the title Baron Moser, of Regent's Park in the London Borough of Camden on 23 June 2001. Other honours included the Albert Medal of the Royal Society of Arts, 1996, Commandeur de l'Ordre National du Mérite (France), 1976; Commander's Cross, Order of Merit (Germany), 1985.

Moser also received an Honorary Doctorate from Heriot-Watt University in 1995.

While on holidays Moser died in Chur (Switzerland) on 4 September 2015, following a stroke.

The Claus Moser Research Centre
Moser was honorary Chancellor at Keele University at a time of rapid change after funding cuts in the early 80s, and appointment of a full-time vice-chancellor to reduce staff / student ratios further after that first emergency. Keele's funding per student was reduced by a third and Oxford's by a thirtieth from similar amounts per head in the 70s.

In 1997 Moser participated in a ceremony to mark the start of construction of the Claus Moser Research Centre, a dedicated research facility for the Humanities and Social Sciences. He returned to the university in June 2008 to participate in the official opening of the £3.5m building.

See also
List of British Jewish scientists

References

External links

Portraits of Statisticians

1922 births
2015 deaths
People from Berlin
People educated at Frensham Heights School
Alumni of the London School of Economics
Chancellors of Keele University
Commanders of the Order of the British Empire
Directors of the Central Statistical Office (United Kingdom)
Fellows of the American Statistical Association
Fellows of Nuffield College, Oxford
Wardens of Wadham College, Oxford
Pro-Vice-Chancellors of the University of Oxford
Fellows of the British Academy
Knights Commander of the Order of the Bath
People associated with the Royal Academy of Music
People's peers
Presidents of the Royal Statistical Society
Commanders Crosses of the Order of Merit of the Federal Republic of Germany
Jewish emigrants from Nazi Germany to the United Kingdom
Refugees ennobled in the United Kingdom
Presidents of the British Science Association
Honorary Fellows of the London School of Economics
Neurological disease deaths in Switzerland
N M Rothschild & Sons people
Life peers created by Elizabeth II